() is a Japanese corporation dealing in petroleum products, aviation fuel storage and related services. Established in 1952, San-Ai has a market capitalization of 72.91 billion yen. It is a member of the Ricoh San-Ai Group. Its headquarters are in Shinagawa, Tokyo.

In December 2004, San-Ai purchased Kygnus Oil from Tonen General Sekiyu and Nichimo, which each owned 50% of Kygnus.

References

External links
 

Oil companies of Japan